United States Pictures (also known as United States Productions) was the name of the motion picture production company belonging to Milton Sperling who was Harry Warner's (of the Warner Bros. studio) son-in-law.  

Sperling was a highly experienced screenwriter and producer with 20th Century Fox and other studios who had just returned from his World War II service in the U.S. Marine Corps Photographic Unit.  Warner Bros. offered Sperling an independent production company that would use Warner Bros. studio resources and financing to make motion pictures that would be released by the studio. In the post World War II era, the Hollywood major studios were beginning to find the idea of purchasing completed motion pictures from independent film production companies more economical than producing the films themselves (although United Artists had done this decades earlier, acting as a distributor for independent films since its establishment in 1919).

Beginning with Fritz Lang's Cloak and Dagger (1946), followed by Raoul Walsh's Pursued (1947), Sperling's United States Pictures made a total of 14 films. The last two, Samuel Fuller's Merrill's Marauders (1962) and Ken Annakin's Battle of the Bulge (1965) were filmed in the Philippines and Spain respectively. Sperling found that the Filipino and Spanish governments and film companies thought they were dealing with a branch of the United States Government due to the name of the company and provided superb cooperation.

Filmography
The United States Pictures marked with an (*) signifies Milton Sperling contributed to the screenplay.

 Cloak and Dagger (1946) - directed by Fritz Lang
 Pursued (1947) - directed by Raoul Walsh
 My Girl Tisa (1948) - directed by Elliott Nugent
 South of St. Louis (1949) - directed by Ray Enright
 Three Secrets (1950) - directed by Robert Wise
 The Enforcer (1951) - directed by Bretaigne Windust & Raoul Walsh (uncredited)
 Distant Drums (1951) - directed by Raoul Walsh
 Retreat, Hell! (1952) - directed by Joseph H. Lewis*
 Blowing Wild (1953) - directed by Hugo Fregonese
 The Court-Martial of Billy Mitchell (1955) - directed by Otto Preminger*
 The Rise and Fall of Legs Diamond (1960) - directed by Budd Boetticher
 The Bramble Bush (1960) - directed by Daniel Petrie*
 Merrill's Marauders (1962) - directed by Samuel Fuller*
 Battle of the Bulge (1965) - directed by Ken Annakin*

References

Film production companies of the United States